Collateral Defect is the sixth studio album by the symphonic black metal band Graveworm, released in 2007. It was produced by Andy Classen.

Track listing

Personnel
Stefan Fiori - Vocals
Eric Righi - Guitar
Lukas Flarer - Guitar
Sabine Mair - Keyboard
Harry Klenk -  Bass
Martin Innerbichler - Drums

2007 albums
Graveworm albums
Nuclear Blast albums